Hendrik (Henk) ten Hoeve (born 15 September 1946) is a Dutch politician.  He led the Independent Senate Group (OSF) in the Senate of the States-Generaal from 10 June 2003, until 7 June 2011. From 9 June 2015 to 11 June 2019 he was again leading the OSF in the Dutch Senate.

Ten Hoeve was born in Heerenveen, Netherlands. He studied economics at the Netherlands School of Economics in Rotterdam. He is the leader of the board of directors of the Dockingacollege school in Dokkum, having been one of its economics teachers and then its "conrector" (deputy head). From 1976 to 1980 Ten Hoeve was chairman of the Frisian National Party and from 1980 to 1988 leader of the States-Provincial of Friesland.

In 2003, in the elections for the Senate, he won only one vote more than the party leader Fons Zinken. Thus Ten Hoeve was placed as number two on the voted preference list. In 2007, he was re-elected. He was also re-elected in 2015.

References
  Parlement.com biography

1946 births
Living people
Dutch directors
Dutch economists
Dutch educators
Erasmus University Rotterdam alumni
Frisian National Party politicians
Members of the Provincial Council of Friesland
Members of the Senate (Netherlands)
Party chairs of the Netherlands
People from Heerenveen